Camptosomata are the case-bearing leaf beetles or camptosomates, named for their larval habit of carrying a case of waste material. This group consists of two subfamilies of Chrysomelidae (leaf beetles): Lamprosomatinae and Cryptocephalinae (which include the former Chlamisinae and Clytrinae).

Each case begins as a wrapping that the mother creates by laying plates of fecal material around each egg.  She begins at one end of the egg and turns it with the addition of each plate.  She then closes it by creating a "roof" at the other end.  When the larva hatches from the egg, it opens the roof of the egg case.  it then extends it head and legs from this opening, flips the case over its back and crawls away.  Larval camptosomates add to and expand this case with their own waste materials as they grow.  They eventually seal off the opening where their head and legs were and pupate inside. When they metamorphose into adults, these beetles then cut a circle around the apex of the case, pop off the cap, and crawl out, ready to feed, mate, and start the cycle over again.

Footnotes

References
  (2005): Aspects of the natural history of Neochlamisus (Coleoptera: Chrysomelidae): fecal-case-associated life history and behavior, with a method for studying insect constructions. Annals of the Entomological Society of America 98(5): 711–725. DOI:10.1603/0013-8746(2005)098[0711:AOTNHO]2.0.CO;2 HTML abstract
  (1988): Biology of Camptosomata Clytrinae - Cryptocephalinae - Chlamisinae - Lamprosomatinae. In: : Biology of Chrysomelidae: 513–552. Kluwer Academic Publishers, Boston.

Chrysomelidae